O'Raghallaighs GFC are a Gaelic Athletic Association club from Drogheda, County Louth, Ireland. The club fields Gaelic football teams in competitions organised by Louth GAA. The club have GAA Handball teams and the ladies football team is an amalgamation with the Slane Road team Oliver Plunketts GFC, forming the O'Raghallaighs/Oliver Plunketts Ladies GAA.

The club plays in the Louth county grounds which is situated directly next to United Park the home of Drogheda United.

History
The club was founded on 12 July 1957.

The men’s adult team won the Division 2 League in 2011, 2018 and 2022, the Division 2B League in 2005, the Paddy Sheelan Cup in 2010 and the Kevin Mullen Shield in 1998 and 2001.

Honours
Louth Senior Football Championship: 1
1965
Cardinal O'Donnell Cup: 1
1973
Louth Intermediate Football Championship: 1
 2011
 Louth Junior Football Championship Winners:3
 1963, 1991 ,2001
 Louth Minor Football Championship: 4
 1959, 1960, 1961, 1963
 Division 2 League: 3 
 2011, 2018, 2022
  Division 2B League :1
 2005
Paddy Sheelan Cup :1
 2010
Kevin Mullen Shield :3
 1988, 1998, 2001

Notable players
Jack McKenna
Shane Toal
Darren Cowley
Gary O'Rourke
Ciaran Brassil
Cathal McGinty
Tom O'Driscoll
Anthony Briscoe
Andrew Rogan
Alan McEneaney
Paul Farrelly
Kevin King 
Aidan Lambe 
Derek Toal 
Darren Boyle 
Alan “Click” Clarke 1-2 v Western
Peter Moore
John O’Reilly
Tommy McKenna
Danny O’Brien
Gordon Yorke
Keith Hughes
Barry “Big Baz” Lynch
Lukie O’Dowd
Robert McKenna

In the news

References

Gaelic games clubs in County Louth
Gaelic football clubs in County Louth